Transpositions matrix (Tr matrix) is square  matrix, which elements are obtained from the elements of given n-dimensional vector  as follows: , where  denotes operation "bitwise Exclusive or" (XOR). The rows and columns of Transpositions matrix consists permutation of elements of vector X, as there are n/2 transpositions between every two rows or columns of the matrix

Example 

The figure below shows Transpositions matrix  of order 8, created from arbitrary vector

Properties 
  matrix is symmetric matrix.
  matrix is persymmetric matrix, i.e. it is symmetric with respect to the northeast-to-southwest diagonal too.
 Every one row and column of  matrix consists all n elements of given vector  without repetition.
 Every two rows  matrix consists  fours of elements with the same values of the diagonal elements. This property, named “Tr-property” is specific to  matrices.

The figure on the right shows some fours of elements in  matrix.

Transpositions matrix with mutually orthogonal rows (Trs matrix) 
The property of fours of  matrices gives the possibility to create matrix with mutually orthogonal rows and columns ( matrix ) by changing the sign to an odd number of elements in every one of fours , . In [5] is offered algorithm for creating  matrix using Hadamard product, (denoted by ) of Tr matrix and n-dimensional Hadamard matrix whose rows (except the first one) are rearranged relative to the rows of Sylvester-Hadamard matrix in order , for which the rows of the resulting Trs matrix are mutually orthogonal.

where: 
 "" denotes operation Hadamard product
  is n-dimensional Identity matrix.
  is n-dimensional Hadamard matrix, which rows are interchanged against the Sylvester-Hadamard[4] matrix in given order  for which the rows of the resulting  matrix are mutually orthogonal.
  is the vector from which the elements of  matrix are derived.

Orderings R of Hadamard matrix’s rows were obtained experimentally for  matrices of sizes 2, 4 and 8. It is important to note, that the ordering R of Hadamard matrix’s rows (against the Sylvester-Hadamard matrix) does not depend on the vector . Has been proven[5] that, if  is unit vector (i.e. ), then  matrix (obtained as it was described above) is matrix of reflection.

Example of obtaining Trs matrix 

Transpositions matrix with mutually orthogonal rows ( matrix)  of order 4 for vector  is obtained as:

As can be seen from the figure above, the first row of the resulting  matrix contains the elements of the vector  without transpositions and sign change. Taking into consideration that the rows of the  matrix are mutually orthogonal, we get

which means that the  matrix rotates the vector , from which it is derived, in the direction of the coordinate axis 

In [5] are given as examples code of a Matlab functions that creates  and  matrices for vector  of size n = 2, 4, or, 8. Stay open question is it possible to create  matrices of size, greater than 8.

See also

 Symmetric matrix
 Persymmetric matrix
 Orthogonal matrix

References

External links
http://article.sapub.org/10.5923.j.ajcam.20190904.03.html

Matrices